The February 1974 Dissolution Honours List was issued on 2 April 1974 following the dissolution of the United Kingdom parliament in preparation for a general election.

Life Peers

Baronesses
 Mervyn Pike, Member of Parliament for the Melton Division of Leicestershire 1956-74; Assistant Postmaster General 1959-63; Joint Parliamentary Under-Secretary of State, Home Office 1963-64.
 Rt Hon. Dame Margaret Patricia Hornsby-Smith , Member of Parliament for Chislehurst 1950-66 and 1970–74; Parliamentary Secretary, Ministry of Health 1951-57; Joint Parliamentary Under-Secretary of State, Home Office 1957-59; Joint Parliamentary Secretary, Ministry of Pensions and National Insurance 1959-61.

Barons
 Sir Tufton Victor Hamilton Beamish , Member of Parliament for the Lewes Division of, East Sussex 1945-74.
 Sir Richard Michael Fraser , Deputy Chairman of the Conservative Party Organisation since October 1964.
 Rt Hon. Geoffrey William Lloyd, Member of Parliament for Birmingham, Ladywood Division 1931-45, King's Norton Division 1950-55; Sutton Coldfield 1955-74; Minister of Fuel and Power 1951-55; Minister of Education 1957-59.
 Rt Hon. Ernest Marples, Member of Parliament for Wallasey 1945-74; Postmaster General 1957-59; Minister of Transport 1959-64.
 Rt Hon. Michael Antony Cristobal Noble, Member of Parliament for Argyllshire 1958-74; Secretary of State for Scotland 1962-64; Minister for Trade 1970-72.
 Rt Hon. Duncan Edwin Sandys , Member of Parliament for Norwood 1935-45; Streatham 1950-74; Minister of Works 1944-45; Minister of Supply 1951-54; Minister of Housing and Local Government 1954-57; Minister of Defence 1957-59; Minister of Aviation 1959-60; Secretary of State for Commonwealth Relations 1960-1964.
 Rt Hon. Sir Robert Hugh Turton , Member of Parliament for the Thirsk and Malton Division of Yorkshire 1929-74; Minister of Health 1955-57.

Privy Counsellors (PC)
 Betty Harvie Anderson , Member of Parliament for East Renfrewshire since 1959; Deputy Chairman of Ways and Means, House of Commons 1970-73.
 Rt Hon. Priscilla Jean Fortescue, Baroness Tweedsmuir of Belhelvie, Member of Parliament for Aberdeen South 1946-66; Minister of State, Scottish Office 1970-72; Minister of State, Foreign and Commonwealth Office 1972-74.
 James David Gibson-Watt , Member of Parliament for Hereford since 1956; Minister of State, Welsh Office 1970-74.

Knights Bachelor (Kt)
 Brian Caldwell Cook Batsford, Member of Parliament for Ealing South 1958-74; Assistant Whip 1962-64; Opposition Deputy Chief Whip 1964-67.
 Robert Chichester-Clark, Member of Parliament for Londonderry City and County 1955-74; Comptroller of H.M. Household 1961-64; Minister of State, Department of Employment 1972-74.
 Robert William Elliott , Member of Parliament for Newcastle upon Tyne North since 1957; Comptroller of H.M. Household 1970; Vice-Chairman, Conservative Party Organisation since 1970.
 Timothy Peter Geoffrey Kitson , Member of Parliament for Richmond, Yorkshire since 1959; Parliamentary Private Secretary to the Prime Minister 1970-74.
 Harold Brian Seymour Warren , Physician.

The Most Honourable Order of the Bath

Companions (CB)
Civil division
 Robert Temple Armstrong, Principal Private Secretary to the Prime Minister.

Order of St Michael and St George

Knights Commander (KCMG)
 Anthony Henry Fanshawe Royle , Member of Parliament for Richmond, Surrey since 1959; Parliamentary Under Secretary of State, Foreign and Commonwealth Office 1970-74.

Order of the Companions of Honour

Companions (CH)
 Rt Hon. Quintin McGarel, Baron Hailsham of Saint Marylebone , Lord High Chancellor of Great Britain 1970-74.

Order of the British Empire

Dames Commander (DBE)
 Katharine Margaret Alice, The Honourable Mrs. MacMillan, Vice-Chairman of the Conservative Party 1968-71.
 Margot Smith, Chairman of the National Union of Conservative and Unionist Associations.

Commanders (CBE)
 Rt Hon. Patrick Robin Gilbert, Baron Derwent, Minister of State, Board of Trade 1962-63; Minister of State, Home Office 1963-64; Deputy Speaker, House of Lords.
 Alan Green, Member of Parliament for Preston South 1955-64 and 1970–74; Minister of State, Board of Trade 1962-63; Financial Secretary, Treasury 1963-64.
 Rt Hon. Pascoe Christian Victor Francis, Baron Grenfell , Deputy Speaker, House of Lords.
 The Honourable Douglas Richard Hurd , Member of Parliament for Mid-Oxon. Political Secretary to the Prime Minister 1970-74.
 Brendon Straker Sewill , Special Assistant to the Chancellor of the Exchequer 1970-1974. Director of the Conservative Research Department 1965-70.
 Lena Moncrieff Townsend, Leader of the Inner London Education Authority, Greater London Council 1971-72.
 Joan Fleetwood Varley, Deputy Director of Organisation, Conservative Central Office since 1966.

Officers (OBE)
 Miles Matthew Lee Hudson, Political Secretary to the Rt Hon. Sir Alec Douglas-Home  1971-74.
 Lieutenant-Colonel William Reeve , for political and public services in the East Midlands.
 Ann Marcella Springman, for political and public services in Wessex.

Members (MBE)
 Roger Boaden, for political services.
 Rosemary Bushe, Personal Secretary to the Rt Hon. Edward Heath .
 Captain Arthur William Potter Fawcett , for political services in Barnet, Hertfordshire.
 Christabel Phyllis Humphreys, for political services in Wales.
 Kenneth Donald Bremner Pryde, Inspector, Metropolitan Police.
 Peter Radford, Chief Inspector, Metropolitan Police.

British Empire Medal (BEM)
Civil division
 John Harris, Senior Messenger. Formerly Doorkeeper, No. 10 Downing Street.
 Ivy May Moore, lately Telephonist, No. 10 Downing Street.
 George Stanley Newell, Driver to the Rt Hon. Edward Heath .

References

Dissolution Honours
Dissolution Honours 1974